The Mohmand or Mohmand is a prominent tribe of Pashtun people. They are based primarily in the Mohmand territory, which is located in Nangarhar, Afghanistan and Mohmand Agency, Pakistan.

Most people of the  Mohmand tribe speak the northern dialect of Pashto. Rahman Baba and Abdul Hamid Baba are amongst the most popular Pashto poets from the Mohmand tribe. Abdul Ahad Mohmand, the first Afghan astronaut, belonged to this tribe, making Pashto the 4th language to be spoken in outer space in 1988. He was selected from more than 400 candidates to join the Soviet space programme (Soyuz - Mir crew) in 1988.

History 
The Mohmands Ghoryakhel originally lived in the present-day Mohmand region, Kandahar, Ghazni, Ghor, and between the basins of the Tarnak, Oxus and Indus rivers, along the present Afghanistan-Pakistan border.

The Mohmand are historically known for resisting outside forces. From 1672 to 1676, the Mohmand, under the leadership of Aimal Khan Mohmand, rebelled and fought deadly wars against the Mughal Army. 
When Peshawar was annexed formally by the British, the area that comprises the present Mohmand Agency was ruled out by the local tribesmen under the influence of the Khan of Lalpura. The present Khan of Lalpura is "Tahir Zaman Khan Momand". The Safis were under the control of the Khans of Bajaur and the Utmankhels were independent of any Khanate.

The Mohmands fought many times against British India,  Soviet Union, Nato, Pakistan Security Forces and other foreign invaders. The area of the Mohmands may be roughly defined as being bounded on the east by Charsadda, Peshawar District (in present-day Pakistan), north by Bajour Agency, west by Nangarhar (Afghanistan) and south by the Khyber Agency. The Durand line boundary line now runs through the Mohmand area. The Emir of Afghanistan in 1893 gave assurances to the Burhan Khel, Dawezai, Halimzai, Isa Khel, Tarangzai and Utmanzai sections of the Mohmands that they would not suffer from the severance of their ancient connection with Afghanistan; these are known as the Assured Clans. Mohmands live in Afghanistan, primarily in Nangarhar, Ghazni, Kunar, Logar and Kunduz, and in Pakistan as well. Many of them live in the Mohmands village of Pul-e-Jogi, in Braki Brak District. Pul-e-Jogi is a 10-minute drive from Wardak Province. Likewise, Mohmands live in Khyber Pakhtunkhwa province of Pakistan, especially in Mohmand Agency. Many people of Mohmand migrated to India. Among them were 12 brothers who formed a tribe known as Barabasti. The people of Barah Basti are known to Mohmands and their sub clan Daud Zai.

In May 2018, Mohmand tribal elders condemned the merger of the Federally Administered Tribal Areas with Khyber Pakhtunkhwa and were supporters of a separate province Qabailistan.

Mohmand Clans 
The major tribes in Mohmand agency are:
 Baizai
 Khwezai
 Tarakzai
 Haleemzai

Lal Pur was a famous trade route. The Khan would collect taxes from the traders. Lal Pur was considered a kingdom. The Khans fought frequently with the British during the Afghan wars. Saadat Khan of Lal Pur was the father-in-law of Amir of Afghanistan and was the grandfather of the famous Amir Ayub Khan of Afghanistan, also known as "The Victor of Maiwand" or "The Afghan Prince Charlie".

The Marchakhel was the chief of Mohmands and had influence over all Momand tribes except the Safi Mohmand which were under the influence of khan of Bajawar. Marchakhels ruled over all Mohmands. Marchakhels rule was from Lal Pur, Afghanistan to Peshawar, Pakistan.
The Marchakhel family, a sub-tribe of the Tarak Zai Mohmands (Dado khel), is a well-known family from Lal Pur. "Khan kor" ( Royal Family of khan), a sub-tribe of the Marchakhel Mohmands, are among the most powerful Mohmands. The Khan was regarded as the king of Mohmands by many famous Afghans such as Amir Sher Ali Khan of Afghanistan. Khan had Khani over all the Mohmands and continues to have influence over Lal Pur. Most Murchakhel now live in Pakistan.Most influential members of the Royal family of Lalpura are now the major landowners in Mohmand District of Pakistan, descended from Muhammad Ali Khan son of Nauroz Khan. Other members of the family are Khan Tahir Zaman Mohmand , Khan Asad Zaman Mohmand, Dost Muhammad Khan,Gohar Zaman Mohmand and Latif Jan In Michanai area Sardar Khan family residing in riverbank of Kabul, Mughal Khan family residing in Union Council Jogani, presently leading Morcha Khel family in Jogani and Michanai areas '''Nayyer Aman Khan, Inayat Khan Morcha Khel, Nazar Muhammad, Samb Ali Khan, Qaiser Khan etc

Peshawar

Mohmands live in different villages in the south of Peshawar. Their leaders are called by Malik or Arbab, who were under the influence of Khan of Lalpura. Arbab residing in Landi Arbab Peshawar are known as the Mohmand tribe and in their villages from Badaber, Kagawala, Masrezai, Surizai, Sulimankhel, Bazidkhel, Mashokhel, Masho gagar, Sheikhan, Matani, Adezai, Pasani, Hazaar Khwanay, Bahadur Kalay, etc. and the surrounding area; the last village is Landi Arbab. There are five main sub-divisions of the Momand tribe living above the villages of Peshawar. Rahman BaBa Shrine is in Bahadar Kalay Peshawar, he was Momand Ghoryakhel and that village is a Momand tribe. 

 Morcha Khel
 Wand Khel
 Bhai Khel
 Surizai 
 Yara Khel
 Isa Khel

Rivers 
The Kabul River and Swat River are the two rivers that pass through the area of the Lower Mohmand. The Kabul River forms the boundary between the Khyber and Mohmand agencies after entry into Pakistan territory. The flow of the water is from the west towards the east. On entry into Pakistan territory, the course of the Kabul River is through high mountains gorges until after it passes through the Warsak Dam, where after it starts running through the Peshawar valley area. The Swat river flows from the north towards south after entering the agency limits from the Malakand and passes through the area of Prang Ghar/Pindiali Tehsil. The course of this river is also through mountainous territory until it reaches the Munda Headworks wherefrom it starts running through the plains.

Climate 
The climate in Mohmand agency is hot in summer season while cool in winter. The summer season commences from May and continues for 4 months until 31 August. The winter season starts from November and continue until February. The rainfall is scanty. Most of the rainfall is during winter season.

Occupations 
The sources of income are very limited in general except agriculture and some trade/business. Most of the locals are earning their livelihood in the Gulf States.

Places of interest 
Warsak Hydel Power station is situated on the river Kabul about 32.2 km from Peshawar. The construction of the project was started in 1955 and the power station was commissioned in 1960. Before commissioning of Mangla Power station, it was one of the major sources of power.

Mohmand dam is being constructed on Swat River to the east of the agency which is an ideal site for a hydro power station. The Prime Minister Imran Khan initiated the project  in May 2019.

Gandab valley 
This historic valley is situated in the Mohmand agency and shoots forth in the north- west direction from Pir Killa, a village on the main Michni Shabqadar road, and 32 km to the north of Peshawar. It runs parallel to a dry bed of a nullah; it is inhabited by the Halim zai section of the Mohmand tribe.

Notable Mohmands  
 Rahman Baba Abdur Rahmān Mohmand (1632–1706) (Pashto: عبدالرحمان بابا), or Rahmān Bābā (Pashto: رحمان بابا), was a renowned Pashtun Sufi Dervish and poet
 Ashfaq Ahmed, writer
 Zain Khan Sirhindi (Mohmand), made Governor (Subahdar) of Sirhind province, India by Ahmad Shah Durrani (Abdali). Died in the Battle of Sirhind (1764).
 Hanif Atmar Foreign Minister of the Islamic Republic of Afghanistan 
 Ashfaq Ahmed, writer
 Mohammad Gul Khan Momand was in Afghans Army Officer in 1919
 Abdul Ahad Mohmand, the first Afghan and the fourth Muslim to reach outer space.
 Qalandar Momand, Pashto scholar, poet, critic, short story writer, journalist, linguist, lexicographer and academician.
 Rustam Shah Mohmand, Chief Secretary, N.W.F.P. province of Pakistan

References

External links 
 Mohmand Agency

Pashto-language surnames
Sarbani Pashtun tribes
Social groups of Pakistan
Ethnic groups in Nangarhar Province
Ethnic groups in Kunar Province